João José dos Santos (born 25 July 1955), known as Santos, is a Brazilian former footballer. He competed in the men's tournament at the 1976 Summer Olympics and won a gold medal in football at the 1975 Pan American Games.

References

External links
 

1955 births
Living people
Brazilian footballers
Brazil international footballers
Olympic footballers of Brazil
Footballers at the 1976 Summer Olympics
Sportspeople from Recife
Association footballers not categorized by position
Pan American Games gold medalists for Brazil
Pan American Games medalists in football
Footballers at the 1975 Pan American Games
Medalists at the 1975 Pan American Games